A sampot, a long, rectangular cloth worn around the lower body, is a traditional dress in Cambodia.  It can be draped and folded in several different ways. The traditional dress is similar to the dhoti of Southern Asia. It is also worn in the neighboring countries of Laos and Thailand where it is known as pha nung.

Origins
The Sampot dates back to the Funan era when a Cambodian king ordered the people of his kingdom to wear the Sampot at the request of Chinese envoys. It is similar to the lungi and dhoti worn in the Indian subcontinent, the longyi worn in Burma, and the sarong worn in maritime Southeast Asia. Silk weaving was an important part of Cambodia's cultural past.  People from Takéo Province have woven silk since the Funan era and records, bas-reliefs, and Zhou Daguan's report have shown that looms were used to weave sompots since ancient times. 

Complex methods and intricate patterns have been developed to make the cloth, one of which is the hol method which involves dyeing patterns on silk before weaving.  What remains unique to Cambodian weavers is the uneven twill technique. The reason they adopted such an unusual method remains unclear. 

However, little is known about the Old Khmer vocabulary for these fabrics, and if the sampot today was simply changed over time from the original Angkorian textiles. The ancient bas-reliefs however provide a complete look at what fabrics were like, down to patterns and pleats.  Silk woven cloths are used in weddings and funerals and for decoration of temples.

Textiles
There are three important silk textiles in Cambodia.  They include the ikat silks (chong kiet in Khmer), or hol, the twill-patterned silks and the weft ikat textiles.  Patterns are made by tying natural and synthetic fibers on the weft threads and then it is dyed. It is repeated for different colors until the patterns firm and cloth is woven. 

Traditionally, five colors are used, predominantly red, yellow, green, blue and black.  The Sompot Hol is used as a lower garment and as the sompot chang kben.  The Pidan Hol is used as a ceremonial hanging used for religious purposes.

Variations

There are many variations of the sampot, each is worn according to class.  The typical regular sampot, known also as the sarong is typically worn by men and women of lower class.  It measures approximately one and a half meters and both ends are sewn together.  It is tied to secure it on the waist.

The Sampot Phamuong are many different variations of traditional Khmer textiles.  They are single colored and twill woven. There are currently 52 colors used in Sampot Phamuong. The Phamuong Chorabap is a luxurious fabric using up to 22 needles to create. Phamuong variation are rabak, chorcung, anlounh, kaneiv and bantok. It usually uses floral and geometric motifs. The most valued silk used to create the Phamuong is Cambodian yellow silk, known for its fine quality in the region. New designs draw inspiration from ancient patterns on old silk.

The Sampot Hol is a typical traditional textile. There are two kinds of Sampot Hol, one is a wrapping skirt that uses a technique called chang kiet and twill weave. Influenced by the Indian patola, it developed patterns and techniques over the centuries to become a genuine Khmer art style. The sampot hol has over 200 patterns combined with three to five colors, yellow, red, brown, blue, and green. There are four variations, sampot hol, sompot hol por, sampot hol kben, and sampot hol ktong.  Patterns are usually geometric motifs, animals, and flower motifs.

In daily life

The sompot is deeply rooted in Cambodia. Even though the French brought a degree of Westernization to Cambodia, Cambodians continued to wear the sompot. Royalty and government officials used the sampot chang kben with a formal jacket. The sompot chong kben and sompot phamuong are still worn by Cambodians today during special occasions, and rural and poor Khmers still prefer it over Western-style clothing for its comfort. 

The material used by poor and rural Cambodians is not hand-woven silk but printed batik-patterned cloth imported from Indonesia. It is still popular with both men and women alike and is regarded by the people of Cambodia as their national garment.

See also
Khmer Traditional Dress
Cambodian clothing
Culture of Cambodia
Culture of Thailand
Sompot Samloy
Longyi
Lungi
Malong
Patadyong
Sarong
Sinh

Further reading

References

External links

https://web.archive.org/web/20070927205831/http://www.camnet.com.kh/cambodia.daily/selected_features/color.htm
http://www.bookrags.com/research/clothing-traditionalcambodia-ema-02/

Cambodian clothing
Skirts
Trousers and shorts
Folk costumes